This is a list of the mayors of Mosman Council and its predecessor titles and organisations, a local government area in the lower north shore region of Sydney, New South Wales, Australia. The official title of mayors while holding office is His/Her Worship the Mayor of Mosman.

The current mayor of Mosman is Councillor Carolyn Corrigan, a member of the Serving Mosman independent political alliance, who was first elected on 9 September 2017, and re-elected for a second term on 4 December 2021.

History
Mosman was first incorporated in 1867 as the "Mossmans Ward" of the Municipality of St Leonards, which lasted until 1890 when the municipalities of Victoria, St Leonards and East St Leonards merged to form the Municipality of North Sydney, with the Mosman ward renamed as the "Mossman Ward". Following a petition submitted by residents in 1892, on 11 April 1893 the ward's separation as the Borough of Mosman was proclaimed by Lieutenant-Governor Sir Frederick Darley. The first nine-member council was elected on 9 June 1893, with the first mayor, Richard Hayes Harnett Jr., elected on the same day. From 28 December 1906, following the passing of the Local Government Act, 1906, the council was renamed as the "Municipality of Mosman". With the passing of the Local Government Act, 1993, the Municipality of Mosman was legally renamed as Mosman Council and aldermen were renamed councillors.

List of incumbents
The following individuals have been elected as the Mayor of Mosman Council, or any predecessor titles.

Town Clerks/General Managers
The Local Government Act, 1993 removed the requirement that the administrative head of a council be a "Town or Shire Clerk" and specified that the head was to be known as the "General Manager".

References

External links

Mosman
Mayor Mosman
Mosman Council